Alcalá de la Selva is a municipality located in the province of Teruel, Aragon, Spain. According to the 2004 census (INE), the municipality has a population of 523 inhabitants.

Formerly a Moorish town known as Al-Qual' at, Alcalá de la Selva was regained by Alfonso II in 1170. Between 1835 and 1840, the town was occupied by the forces of Don Carlos troops during the First Carlist War.

References 

Municipalities in the Province of Teruel